The largest quantities of gold found in the eastern United States were found in the Georgia Gold Belt, extending from eastern Alabama to Rabun County, Georgia.  The biggest concentration of gold was found in White, Lumpkin, and northern Cherokee counties in Georgia. The gold in the Georgia Gold Belt was close to 24 karat (100%) purity.  Most of the gold was found in eroded rock (saprolite) and mixed in with quartz.

Besides placer deposits of gold, and gold bearing quartz in weathered rock, gold also occurs in quartz veins.  The most profitable veins, in the Dahlonega District, occur in the contact zone between mica-schists and granite or diorite.

The discovery of gold in the Georgia Gold Belt in 1828 led to the Georgia Gold Rush.  The historic cities of Auraria and Dahlonega were the primary beneficiaries of the gold discovery, and a branch mint of the United States Mint was operated in Dahlonega until 1861. The Georgia Gold Belt is part of a zone of gold deposits in the southeast United States that runs from Alabama to Virginia. Smaller gold deposits can be found farther north.

See also
 List of gold mines in Georgia

References

External links
 'Thar's Gold in Them Thar Hills': Gold and Gold Mining in Georgia, 1830s-1940s from the Digital Library of Georgia

Geology of Georgia (U.S. state)
Geography of Cherokee County, Georgia
Geography of Lumpkin County, Georgia
Geography of Rabun County, Georgia
Geography of White County, Georgia
Georgia Gold Rush
Metallogenetic provinces
Belt regions of the United States